Natalia "Natasha" Yarovenko (born 23 July 1979) is a Ukrainian born actress residing in Spain.

Biography 
Natasha Yarovenko graduated in Roman and German Philology in Odesa, Ukraine. In 2000 she moved to Barcelona where she began her career as an actress. Yarovenko first appeared on regional television in Catalonia and then debuted on national television.

In 2011, Yarovenko won two awards for the Best New Actress for her role in the film Room in Rome, one at the Turia Awards and the other at the 25th Goya Awards.

At the end of 2010, Yarovenko bought a small island in the Bahamas for $200,000.

Filmography
2008 – Diary of a Nymphomaniac (Mae)
2009 – Black Buenos Aires (Alma)
2010 – Room in Rome (Natasha)
2010 – Negro Buenos Aires (Alma/Natasha) 
2011 – Order of the Grail (Sigrid)
2012 – Aftershock (Irina)
2015 – Las aventuras del capitán Alatriste (María de Castro)
2016 – Loki 7 (Ivanna)
2020 – Captain of Desert

References

External links

1979 births
Living people
21st-century Ukrainian actresses
Expatriate actresses in Spain
Actors from Odesa
Ukrainian expatriates in Spain
Ukrainian film actresses
Models from Odesa
Odesa University alumni